Vincent Josephat Kiboko Nyerere (born 18 October 1974) is a Tanzanian CHADEMA politician and Member of Parliament for Musoma Town constituency since 2010.

References

1974 births
Living people
Chadema MPs
Tanzanian MPs 2010–2015
People from Musoma